Hariton is a variant spelling of the Greek name Chariton. The Cyrillic spelling "Харитон" may be occasionally transliterated as Chariton, Khariton, and Hariton.

Notable people with this name include:

Given name

Hariton Pushwagner
Heimann Hariton Tiktin
Hariton Paşovschi
 Hariton-Tzannis Alivizatos, microbiologist, a proponent of a putative Greek cancer cure

Surname
Lorraine Hariton, CEO and President of Catalyst (nonprofit organization)
Traian Hariton, a pseudonym of Traian Herseni (1907-1980),  Romanian social scientist, journalist, and political figure

See also
Hariton Peak
Haritina/Kharitina, feminine variant